Institute of Indonesian Arts and Culture, Bandung (abbreviated as ISBI Bandung), is a state-owned, arts and cultural-oriented educational institution located in Bandung, Indonesia.

History
In the beginning, the Institute of Indonesian Arts and Culture, Bandung, was called Dance Conservatory (Indonesian: Konservatori Tari (KORI)) which was founded in March 1968. However, during this period, the institute was not yet a formal higher education institution. By 1971, an agreement was signed between several government agencies and art education institutes in Bandung, West Java, and Yogyakarta, which led to the Dance Conservatory to function as a branch of the Indonesian Dance Academy of Yogyakarta (Indonesian: Akademi Seni Tari Indonesia (ASTI) Yogyakarta) – which was a precursor to the modern-day Institute of Indonesian Arts and Culture, Yogyakarta – leading to the Dance Conservatory to be renamed Indonesian Dance Academy of Bandung (Indonesian: Akademi Seni Tari Indonesia (ASTI) Bandung).

In 1995, due to a governmental initiative for art higher education development, the Indonesian Dance Academy of Bandung underwent another structural and name change, becoming the Indonesian Art College of Bandung (Sekolah Tinggi Seni Indonesia (STSI) Bandung). Several new programs were added to the school, including karawitan, theater, performing arts, fine arts, beauty and fashion, television and film, as well as angklung study and bamboo music. Finally, in 2014, the art college became the Institute of Indonesian Arts and Culture following a presidential decree by Susilo Bambang Yudhoyono.

Logo and philosophy 
The logo of the institute is dark blue, and is made up of several components.

 Fishbone cactus flower, indicating vitality, blessing, glory, and honor.
 Bow, indicating focused mind.
 Flying bird wings, indicating dynamism, energy, optimism, and adaptability.
 Rebab, indicating art interpretation and creation.

Each of the faculties has a different flag color with a white-colored version of the institute's logo on the center of the flag.

Faculties

Undergraduate Degree

Faculty of Performing Arts
Department of Dance, offers courses in Dance Performance, and Choreography, Modern and Traditional Dance
Department of Theater, offers courses in Acting, Directing, Stage Setting and Script Writing
Department of Karawitan Music, offers courses in Sundanese Music Performance and Composisition
Department of Bamboo Music, offers courses in Bamboo and Music Performance
Department of Sundanese Traditional Dance

Faculty of Art and Design
Department of Visual Art and Crafts, offers courses in Scenography, Graphic Design and Craft 
Department of Fine Art, offers courses in Painting, Sculpture, and Art Research
Department of Make Up and Fashion Design

Faculty of Cultural and Media
Department of Television and Film
Department of Cultural Anthropology
Department of Photography

Master's Degree
Master of Fine Arts in Art Creation (project)
Master of Fine Arts in Art Interpretation (research)

Facilities

Performing arts center 
The institute has five performing arts center, including two pendopo-style buildings (Pendopo Mundinglaya, Pendopo Mundinglaya 2), two high-rise buildings (Gedung Pertunjukan Sunan Ambu, Gedung Olah Seni Patanjala), and one open theater-style space (Mini Panggun Terbuka Karawitan).

Studio 
There are seven studios in the vicinity of the institute. Three of them are dedicated to fine arts students, while the remaining four are for beauty and fashion, dance, theatre, and karawitan students.

Other facilities 
The institute also has a health clinic, library, language laboratory, as well as several sports and prayer areas, including a mosque named Asy Syuaraa Mosque.

References

External links
 

Universities in Indonesia
Educational institutions established in 1968
1968 establishments in Indonesia
Universities in West Java
Indonesian state universities
Art schools